David Gee may refer to:

 David Gee (artist) (1793–1872), English painter
 David Gee (forger) (1929–2013), Australian coin forger
 David Gee (sheriff), sheriff of Hillsborough County, Florida
 David Gee (soccer), soccer coach and administrator